The 1998 Women's World Open Squash Championship was the women's edition of the 1998 World Open, which serves as the individual world championship for squash players. The event took place in Stuttgart in Germany during November 1998. Sarah Fitzgerald won her third World Open title, defeating Michelle Martin in a repeat of the 1997 final.

Seeds

Qualifying round

Draw and results

See also
World Open
1998 Men's World Open Squash Championship

References

External links
Womens World Open

World Squash Championships
1998 in squash
1998 in German sport
Squash tournaments in Germany
1998 in women's squash
International sports competitions hosted by Germany